The Arga-Yuryakh (Arğaa Ürex) is a river in Sakha Republic (Yakutia), Russia. It is a tributary of the Rassokha of the Alazeya basin.

The river flows north of the Arctic Circle, across desolate tundra territories of the East Siberian Lowland. Its basin falls within Srednekolymsky District. The name of the river comes from the Yakut "Arğaa-ürex" (Арҕаа-үрэх), meaning "western river".

Course
It flows roughly southwards away from the range, first following its southern flank eastwards, then bending southwards into a region of lakes of the Kolyma Lowland. The river meanders strongly, heading southeastwards across the vast lake area. Finally it meets the left bank of the northward flowing Ilin-Yuryakh. The confluence of both rivers forms the Rassokha, the largest tributary of the Alazeya.

Tributaries
The river is frozen between late September or early October and late May or early June. 

The Arga-Yuryakh is fed by snow, rain and ice. The river basin is marked by permafrost, swamps and lakes, the lake surface taking 15.2 % of the total basin area.

See also
List of rivers of Russia

References

External links 
Fishing & Tourism in Yakutia
Бассейн р. Арга-Юрях, 2003 год

Alazeya basin
Rivers of the Sakha Republic
East Siberian Lowland